Saša Rašilov (born Alexandr Rašilov, 26 July 1972) is a Czech film and stage actor. He studied at the Faculty of Theatre in Prague, later performing on stage at theatres including the Theatre on the Balustrade. He is the grandson and namesake of Czechoslovak actor Saša Rašilov (1891–1955). He was married to actress Vanda Hybnerová, with whom he has two daughters, between 1993 and 2014. His younger brother  (born 1976) is an actor as well.

Selected filmography 
Big Beat (1993)
Loners (2000)
Rodinná pouta (television, 2006)
ROMing (2007)
Velmi křehké vztahy (television, 2007–2009)
 Hranaři (2011)
The Little Man (2015)
 Arvéd (2022)

References

External links

1972 births
Living people
Czech male film actors
Czech male stage actors
Czech male voice actors
Male actors from Prague
20th-century Czech male actors
21st-century Czech male actors
Academy of Performing Arts in Prague alumni
Recipients of the Thalia Award